The following is a list of notable earthquakes or tremors that have been detected within South Africa.

According to Professor Andrzej Kijko from the University of Pretoria's Natural Hazard Centre, mining can activate natural faults. He believes that 95% of South Africa's earthquakes are caused by mining, especially around the areas of Klerksdorp, Welkom and Carletonville. According to earth science consultant Dr Chris Hartnady, "This part of Africa is in the vicinity of the African Rift system, which is being pulled apart by a few millimetres annually." He says "earthquakes are caused by a slip on a fault line and the release of stored elastic energy" and mining activity can trigger earthquakes.

Earthquake data 
For earthquakes prior to the modern era, the magnitude and epicentre location are only approximate, and were calculated based on available reports from the time. The magnitude where given is measured using the Richter scale unless stated otherwise.

20th and 21st century

See also
Geology of South Africa

References

External links 
 Council for Geoscience
 South Africa Earthquake Information – United States Geological Survey

South Africa
Earthquakes
 
earthquakes